Zirabad-e Zirab (also Romanized as Zīrābād-e Zīrāb; also known as Zīrābād) is a village in Rameshk Rural District, Chah Dadkhoda District, Qaleh Ganj County, Kerman Province, Iran. At the 2006 census, its population was 81, in 20 families.

References 

Populated places in Qaleh Ganj County